The 2013–14 Scottish Challenge Cup, known as the Ramsdens Challenge Cup due to sponsorship reasons with Ramsdens, was the 23rd season of the competition. It was contested by 32 clubs, which included the 30 members of the 2013–14 Scottish Championship-League Two, the top Highland League club with a valid SFA club licence (Formartine United) and the winner of a preliminary round tie between the highest placed top in the East of Scotland League with a valid SFA club licence (Spartans) and their counterparts in the South of Scotland League (Threave Rovers), the preliminary tie was a two-legged tie played on the Saturdays of 13 and 20 July with Spartans at home in the 1st leg. Spartans came out on top.

The defending champions were Queen of the South, who defeated Partick Thistle in the 2013 final.

Raith Rovers won the trophy with a late winner by John Baird against Rangers at Easter Road in Edinburgh.

Schedule

Fixtures and results

Preliminary round

First leg

Second leg

First round

The first round draw took place on Friday 28 June 2013 at 11am BST at Hampden Park.

North and East Region

Source:

South and West Region

Source:

Second round

The second round draw took place on Wednesday 31 July 2013 at 3pm BST at the Ramsdens store in Clydebank.

North and East Region

Source:

South and West Region

Source:

Quarter-finals

The quarter-final draw took place on Thursday 22 August 2013 at 2pm BST at Hampden Park in Glasgow.

Source:

Semi-finals

The semi-final draw took place on Thursday 19 September 2013 at 2pm BST at Hampden Park in Glasgow.

Source:

Final

Source:

References

External links
Ramsdens Cup at the Scottish Professional Football League
Ramsdens – the tournament sponsor

Scottish Challenge Cup seasons
Challenge Cup
3